Vice Admiral Sir Clive Charles Carruthers Johnstone,  (born 6 September 1963) is a retired Royal Navy officer who served as Commander, Allied Maritime Command from 2015 to 2019.

Early life and education
Johnstone was born on 6 September 1963 in Kampala, Uganda. He was educated at Shrewsbury School, an all-boys public school. He studied anthropology at Durham University, graduating with a Bachelor of Arts (BA) degree.

Naval career
Johnstone joined the Royal Navy in 1985. He became commanding officer of the frigate  in 1999. He became the Fleet Programmer in 2001, Commanding Officer of the amphibious transport dock  in 2005, and Director of Naval Staff at the Ministry of Defence in April 2008.

Johnstone went on to be Principal Staff Officer to the Chief of the Defence Staff in December 2008, Flag Officer, Sea Training in July 2011, and Assistant Chief of the Naval Staff (Policy) in May 2013. His latest appointment was as Commander Allied Maritime Command in October 2015, when he was promoted to vice admiral on 15 October 2015. Johnstone was replaced as Commander Allied Maritime Command by Vice Admiral Keith Blount on 20 May 2019.

Johnstone was appointed a Knight Commander of the Order of the British Empire in the 2019 New Year Honours, and retired from the Royal Navy on 3 January 2020.

References

|-

1963 births
Alumni of the College of St Hild and St Bede, Durham
Companions of the Order of the Bath
Knights Commander of the Order of the British Empire
Living people
People educated at Shrewsbury School
Royal Navy vice admirals
Royal Navy personnel of the Iraq War
People from Kampala